The Roman Catholic Diocese of Novigrad (alias Diocese of Cittanova in Italian) was a Latin rite diocese located in the city of Novigrad, Istria, Croatia until it was suppressed to the Diocese of Trieste in 1831.

History 
TO ELABORATE 
 Established in 520 as the Diocese of Cittanova/ Novigrad, on reassigned territory from the suppressed Diocese of Emona
 Lost territory in 542 to establish the Diocese of Trieste (Italy)
 Gained territory back in 557 from above daughter Diocese of Trieste
 Lost territory in 811 to the Patriarchate of Aquileia (Italy)
 Held in personal union ('United aeque principaliter) with the (also Croatia]]) Diocese of Poreč 1442–1448
 united aeque principaliter with the Patriarchate of Grado (Italy) 1448–1451.10.08
 united aeque principaliter with the Patriarchate of Venice (Venezia, Italy; Grado's Patriarchal successor see) 1451.10.08–1465
 Gained territory back in 1784 from above Italian daughter Diocese of Trieste
 Suppressed on 30 June 1828, its territory being merged into the Diocese of Trieste via the papal bull, Locum Beati Petri, issued by Pope Leo XII on 30 June 1828; other sources state the official suppression came later on 23 May 1831

Residential Episcopal Ordinaries 
(all Roman Rite)
incomplete : first centuries lacking

Suffragan Bishops of Cittanova/ Novigrad
 Leonardo (1212? – death 1224)
 Canziano (1228? – ?)
 Gerardo (1230.06.05 – 1237?)
 Bonaccorso (1243? – 1260?)
 Nicolò (1269? – ?)
 Egidio (1279? – 1283?)
 Simone (1284.05.15 – 1301?)
 Giraldo, Dominican Order (O.P.) (1308 – 1310?)
 Canziano (1318 – death 1330.04.04)
 Natale Bonafede (1330 – death 1344?)
 Giovanni Morosini, O.E.S.A. (1347.02.12 – death 1358?)
 Guglielmo Conti, O.P. (1359.03.15 – ?)
 Giovanni Grandi(s), Augustinian Order (O.E.S.A.) (21 April 1363 - death 1365)
 Marino Michiel (1366.01.14 – death 1374?)
 Nicolò Montaperto, Friars Minor (O.F.M.) (1376.05.14 – 1377.02.18), next Metropolitan Archbishop of Palermo (Sicily, Italy) (1377.02.18 – death 1382)
 Archbishop-bishop Ambrogio da Parma (1377.02.20 – 1380.10.10), previously Metropolitan Archbishop of Oristano (Italy) (1364 – 1377.02.20); later Archbishop-Bishop of Concordia (Italy) (1380.10.10 – 1389), Archbishop-Bishop of Tuscanella (1389 – 1391), Archbishop-Bishop of Viterbo (Italy) (1389 – death 1391)
 Paolo da Montefeltro, O.E.S.A. (1382.04 – 1400.08)
Apostolic Administrator Leonardo (1401.07.27 – ?), no other prelature recorded
 Tommaso Tommasini Paruta, O.P. (1409 – 1420.03.04), next Bishop of Pula (Croatia) (1420.03.04 – 1423.09.24), Bishop of Urbino (Italy) (1423.09.24 – 1424.12.11), Bishop of Traù (1424.12.11 – 1435.10.24), Bishop of Macerata (Italy) (1435.10.24 – 1440.10.15), Bishop of Recanati (Italy) (1435.10.24 – 1440.10.15), Bishop of Feltre (Italy) (1440.10.15 – death 1446.03.24)
 Giacomo de Montina, O.F.M. (1409.09.09 – ?)
Apostolic Administrator Cardinal Antonio Correr, C.R.S.A. (25 April 1420 - 20 Feb 1421), while Cardinal-Bishop of Suburbicarian Diocese of Porto e Santa Rufina (1409.05.09 – 1431.03.14), Chamberlain of the Holy Roman Church of Reverend Apostolic Camera (1412.07 – ?), Archpriest of Papal Basilica of St. Peter (1420 – 1434); later Cardinal Dean of Sacred College of Cardinals (1431? – 1445.01.19), transferred Cardinal-Bishop of Suburbicarian Diocese of Ostia–Velletri (1431.03.14 – death 1445.01.19), Apostolic Administrator of Diocese of Rimini (Italy) (1435.10.10 – 1435.11.21) and Apostolic Administrator of Diocese of Cervia (Italy) (1435.11 – 1440)
 Daniel Rampi Scoto (26 Feb 1421 - 7 Jan 1426), ?next Bishop of Poreč
 Filippo Paruta (1426.01.07 – 1426.04.02), next Bishop of Torcello (Italy) (1426.04.02 – 1448.02.20), Metropolitan Archbishop of Crete (insular Greece) (1448.02.20 – death 1458)
 Giovanni Morosini (1426.11.05 – 1442?), succeeding as previous Apostolic Administrator of Cittanova (1426.05.27 – 1426.11.05)
 Giovanni di Parenzo (1442 – retired 1448), died 1457; previously Bishop of Arba (Croatia) (1433.01.07 – 1440.04.11), Bishop of Poreč (Croatia) (1440.04.11 – 1457)

Patriarch of Grado and Suffragan Bishop of Cittanova/ Novigrad
 Domenico Michiel (1448 – 1451), only incumbent in personal union Patriarch of Grado (Italy) (1445.01.08 – 1451)

Patriarchs of Venice and Suffragan Bishops of Cittanova/ Novigrad
 Saint Lorenzo Giustiniani (1451.10.08 – 1456.01.08), first in personal union Patriarch of Venezia (Venice, Italy) (1451.10.08 – 1456.01.08); previously Bishop of Castello (1433.05.12 – 1451.10.08)
 Maffio Contarini (1456 – 1460)
 Andrea Bondimerio, Augustinian Order (O.E.S.A.) (1460 – 1464)
 Gregorio Correr (1464 – 1464)
 Giovanni Barozzi (1465.01.07 – death 1465); previously Bishop of Bergamo (Italy) (1449.10.31 – 1465.01.07)

Suffragan Bishops of Cittanova/ Novigrad
 Francesco Contarini (1466 – 1495)
 Marcantonio Foscarini (1495 – death 1521)
Archbishop-bishop Antonio Marcello, Conventual Franciscans (O.F.M. Conv.) (1521.09.06 – 1526), previously Titular Archbishop of Patrasso (Patrae, peninsular Greece) (1520.05.21 – 1521.09.06)
Apostolic Administrator Cardinal Francesco Pisani (28 Sep 1526 - 10 May 1535), see below, while Cardinal-Deacon of S. Teodoro (1518.10.22 – 1527.05.03), Bishop of Padova (Padua, Italy) (1524.08.08 – 1555); next promoted Cardinal-Priest of S. Marco (1527.05.03 – 1555.05.29), Apostolic Administrator of Diocese of Treviso (Italy) (1528.01.27 – 1564), also Cardinal-Deacon of S. Maria in Portico in commendam (1528.02.27 – 1541.05.04) and Cardinal-Deacon of S. Agata alla Suburra in commendam (1529.05.24 – 1545.01.09) and Cardinal-Deacon of S. Maria in Portico in commendam (1550.02.28 – 1555.05.29), Apostolic Administrator of Archdiocese of Narbonne (France) (1551.05.11 – 1563.10.08), promoted Cardinal-Bishop of Suburbicarian Diocese of Albano (1555.05.29 – 1557.09.20), remaining Cardinal-Priest of S. Marco in commendam (1555.05.29 – 1564.06.21) see below
 Vincenzo de Benedictis (1535.05.10 – death 1536)
 Alessandro Orsi (1536.09.01 – 1559)
Apostolic Administrator Cardinal Francesco Pisani (again, see above 1559 – 1561.09.05 see below), while Cardinal-Bishop of Frascati (1557.09.20 – 1562.05.18)
 Matteo Priuli (bishop) (1561.09.05 – 1565.04.13)
Apostolic Administrator Cardinal Francesco Pisani (1559 – 1561.09.05), while  Cardinal-Bishop of Suburbicarian Diocese of Ostia–Velletri (1564.05.12 – 1570.06.28) and Cardinal Dean of Sacred College of Cardinals (1564.05.12 – 1570.06.28); long earlier career
 Gerolamo Vielmi, Dominican Order (O.P.) (1570.07.19 – death 1582.03.07)
 Antonio Saraceno (1582.03.28 – death 1606.11.07)
 Franciscus Manini (4 July 1607 - death Sep 1619)
 Eusebius Caimus (10 Feb 1620 - death Oct 1640)
 Jacobus Philippus Tomasini (16 June 1642 - death June 1655)
 Giorgio Darmini (30 August 1655 - death Oct 1670), previously Bishop of Caorle (1653.11.24 – 1655.08.30)
 Giacomo Bruti (1 July 1671 - death Nov 1679)
 Nicolaus Gabrieli (19 June 1684 - 12 April 1717)
 Daniele Sansoni (14 June 1717 - death March 1725), previously Bishop of Caorle (1712.07 – 1717.07.14)
 Vittorio Mazzocca, O.P. (11 June 1725 - death 14 May 1732)
 Gaspar Negri (21 July 1732 - 22 Jan 1742), next Bishop of Diocese of Poreč (Croatia) (1742.01.22 – death 1778.01)
 Marino Bozzatini (9 July 1742 - death 9 July 1754)
 Stefano di Leoni (16 Sep 1754 - death May 1776)
 Giovanni Domenico Straticò, O.P. (15 July 1776 - 20 Sep 1784), next Bishop of Hvar (Croatia) (1784.09.20 – death 1799)
 Antonio Giovanni Giuseppe Lucovich (20 Sep 1784 - death 2 Dec 1794)
 Teodoro Lauretano Balbi (1 June 1795 - death 23 May 1831).

Titular see 
In 1969 the see was nominally restored but demoted as Latin Titular bishopric of Novigrad.

It has had the following titular incumbents, either of the fitting Episcopal (lowest) rank or of higher, archiepiscopal rank:
Titular Archbishop: Ugo Poletti (1969.07.03 – 1973.03.05) as Second Vicegerent for the Vicariate of Rome (Italy) (1969.07.03 – 1972.10.13) and as Pro-Vicar General for the Vicariate of Rome (1972.10.13 – 1973.03.26); previously Titular Bishop of Medeli (1958.07.12 – 1967.06.26) as Auxiliary Bishop of Diocese of Novara (Italy) (1958.07.12 – 1967.06.26), Archbishop of Spoleto (Italy) (1967.06.26 – 1969.07.03); later created Cardinal-Priest of Ss. Ambrogio e Carlo (1973.03.05 – death 1997.02.25), President of Commission for Advocates (1973.03.05 – 1997.02.25), Vicar General for the above Vicariate of Rome (Italy) (1973.03.26 – 1991.01.17), Apostolic Administrator of Suburbicarian Diocese of Ostia (Italy) (1973.03.26 – 1991.01.17), Archpriest of Papal Archbasilica of St. John Lateran (1973.03.26 – 1991.01.17), Grand Chancellor of Pontifical Lateran University (1973.03.26 – 1991.01.17), President of Liturgical Academy (1974? – 1990), President of Episcopal Conference of Italy (1985.07.03 – 1991.03), Archpriest of Papal Basilica of St. Mary Major (1991.01.17 – 1997.02.25)
Titular Archbishop: Maximino Romero de Lema (1973.03.21 – 1996.10.29) as emeritate; previously Titular Bishop of Horta (1964.06.15 – 1968.10.19) as Auxiliary Bishop of Archdiocese of Madrid (Spain) (1964.06.15 – 1968.10.19), Bishop of Ávila (Spain) (1968.10.19 – 1973.03.21), Secretary of Commission of Cardinals for the Pontifical Shrines of Pompeii, Loreto and Bari (1973 – 1986), Secretary of Congregation for Clergy (1973.03.21 – 1986)
Titular Archbishop: Leonardo Sandri (1997.07.22 – 2007.11.24), first as papal diplomat : Apostolic Nuncio (ambassador) to Venezuela (1997.07.22 – 2000.03.01), Apostolic Nuncio to Mexico (2000.03.01 – 2000.09.16), then as Substitute for General Affairs of Secretariat of State (2000.09.16 – 2007.06.09); previously Regent of Prefecture of the Papal Household (1991.08.22 – 1992.04.02), Assessor for General Affairs of Papal Secretariat of State (1992.04.02 – 1997.07.22); later Prefect of Congregation for the Oriental Churches (2007.06.09 – ...), Grand Chancellor of Pontifical Oriental Institute (2007.06.09 – ...), created Cardinal-Deacon of Ss. Biagio e Carlo ai Catinari (2007.11.24 [2007.12.02] – ...)
 Beniamino Pizziol (2008.01.05 – 2011.04.16) as Auxiliary Bishop of Patriarchate of Venezia (Venice, Italy) (2008.01.05 – 2011.04.16); later Bishop of Vicenza (Italy) (2011.04.16 – ...), Apostolic Administrator of Patriarchate of Venice (Venezia, Italy) (2011.09.08 – 2012.01.31)
 Lorenzo Leuzzi (Italian) (2012.01.31 – ...), Auxiliary Bishop of the papal Vicariate of Rome (Italy) (2012.01.31 – ...).

See also 
 List of Catholic dioceses in Croatia

References

Sources and external links 
 GCatholic - data for all sections

Catholic titular sees in Europe
Former Roman Catholic dioceses in Croatia
Suppressed Roman Catholic dioceses